U.S. Route 25 (US 25) runs for  across the state of Kentucky from the split between US 25E and US 25W in North Corbin to US 42/US 127 at the Ohio state line in Covington.

Route description
US 25 technically crosses the Tennessee state line in two places—near Jellico, Tennessee and near Middlesboro—where a split US 25 enters Kentucky as US 25W and US 25E respectively. In North Corbin, the two suffixed highways meet to reform US 25. US 25 runs primarily northward, paralleling Interstate 75 (I-75) along the entire route. From North Corbin, US 25 heads north, passing through London and then heading northwest toward Mount Vernon. After going through Livingston and Mount Vernon, US 25 continues to run northward, passing through Berea. US 25 then meets US 421, which begins a long concurrency with US 25, and the two routes go around Richmond on a bypass.

North of Richmond, US 25/US 421 runs concurrently with I-75 to cross the Kentucky River. Just north of the river, US 25/US 421 splits from I-75 and runs northwesterly into Lexington. In Lexington, US 25 meets US 60 and US 27, and US 68 before US 421 splits off to the northwest in Lexington. US 25 continues north through Georgetown, where it meets US 62 and US 460. The highway continues through Corinth, Williamstown; Dry Ridge; Crittenden; and Walton. In Florence, US 25 meets US 42 and US 127, both of which run concurrently with US 25.

The three routes run northeast through Erlanger, Edgewood, Crestview Hills, Lakeside Park, Fort Mitchell, Fort Wright, Park Hills, and Covington, and intersect I-275 in Crestview Hills and  I-71 and I-75 twice in Fort Mitchell and Covington. In Covington, the three routes begin to cross the Ohio River on the Clay Wade Bailey Bridge. At the Ohio state line, US 25 ends, and US 42/US 127 continues into downtown Cincinnati.

Major intersections

See also

References

External links

 Kentucky
25
Transportation in Laurel County, Kentucky
Transportation in Rockcastle County, Kentucky
Transportation in Madison County, Kentucky
Transportation in Lexington, Kentucky
Transportation in Scott County, Kentucky
Transportation in Grant County, Kentucky
Transportation in Kenton County, Kentucky
Transportation in Boone County, Kentucky